Black Canyon Wilderness Study Area may refer to wilderness study areas managed by the U.S. Bureau of Land Management:

 Black Canyon Wilderness Study Area (Gooding County, Idaho)
 Black Canton, a study area in Butte County, Idaho
 Black Canyon, a study area in Colorado

See also
 Black Canyon Wilderness (disambiguation)